Sumatrothrips is a genus of thrips in the family Phlaeothripidae.

Species
 Sumatrothrips filiceps

References

Phlaeothripidae
Thrips
Thrips genera